"Tideline" is a science fiction short story  by American writer Elizabeth Bear, published in 2007.  It won the 2008 Hugo Award for Best Short Story and the 2008 Theodore Sturgeon Award (tied with "Finisterra" by David R. Moles). "Tideline" appears in the twenty-fifth volume of Gardner Dozois's Year's Best Science Fiction anthology. In 2020 "Tideline" was read by LeVar Burton for the Stitcher Radio podcast LeVar Burton Reads.

Plot summary
The story follows a sentient war machine, Chalcedony, which is the lone survivor of a previous and highly apocalyptic war that has reduced the human population virtually to cavemen and hunter gatherers.  As Chalcedony combs the beach looking for trinkets it can make into memorials for its fallen comrades, she develops a friendship with an orphaned boy.

When her power cells have completely worn down, the machine hands the trinkets to its now matured companion, telling him to spread the memory of those who fought.

References

External links 
 

Science fiction short stories
2007 short stories
Hugo Award for Best Short Story winning works
Works originally published in Asimov's Science Fiction
Works by Elizabeth Bear
Theodore Sturgeon Award-winning works